Meghna Vincent is an Indian film and television actress who appears in Malayalam and Tamil languages. She is known for her lead roles of Amrutha in Chandanamazha, Rohini in Ponmagal Vanthal and Seetha in Deivam Thandha Veedu.

Early life
Meghna Vincent hails from Cochin, Kerala. Her father, Vincent is employed in Dubai and her mother, a former film actress now runs an event management company. Meghna is a graduate with a B-Com in Computer Applications.

Personal life
Meghna got engaged to Don Tony on 14 February 2016, and married on 30 April 2017 at St Francis of Assisi Cathedral in Ernakulam. The couple later got divorced.

Career
Meghna made her television debut through Malayalam serial Swamiye Saranamayyappa. Later she appeared in a supporting role in serials like Mohakkadal, Indira, and Autograph. She played Sridevi in Malayalam film Parankimala, and Meghna in the Tamil film Kayal.  She played the main female lead Seetha Ram Chakravarthy in the Tamil TV serial Deivam Thandha Veedu which aired on Vijay TV. It was one of the popular Tamil serials which ended in 992 episodes. In February 2014, she started playing the lead role of Amrutha in the Malayalam serial Chandanamazha in Asianet. She opted out of the serial in May 2017 post her marriage. Both the above serials were remakes of Saath Nibhaana Saathiya, a Hindi serial. She played the main role on ATMA's serial  Mamangam. She then played lead roles in the Tamil serial Ponmagal Vanthal and the Malayalam show Mrs. Hitler.

Filmography

Films

Television 
TV series

Other shows

Albums
 Ponmaninadham
 Vishu Pulari
 Chethi Mandharam Thulasi
 Bhadre Saranam
 Guruthi Theertham

Awards

See also 

List of Indian film actresses

References 

1990 births
Living people
Malayali people
Actresses from Kochi
Indian soap opera actresses
21st-century Indian actresses
Actresses in Malayalam television
Actresses in Malayalam cinema
Actresses in Tamil cinema
Actresses in Tamil television
Child actresses in Malayalam cinema